Hart is a local government district in Hampshire, England, named after the River Hart.  Its council is based in Fleet.  It was formed on 1 April 1974 under the Local Government Act 1972, as a merger of the urban district of Fleet, and the Hartley Wintney Rural District. It was named the best place to live in the UK in the 2017 Halifax quality of life study.

Hart District is one of the richest and least deprived areas in the whole of the United Kingdom.  In the Indices of Deprivation 2015, Hart was ranked at 326 out of 326 local authorities in England, where 1 was the most deprived area and 326 the least deprived, meaning Hart is the least deprived area in England.

For five years running (2011-2015), an annual study conducted by the Halifax bank named Hart as the UK's most desirable place to live for quality of life. The study took into account jobs, housing, health, crime, weather, traffic and broadband access. It found that in 2014 97% of people in the local authority area were in good health, and in 2011 tended to have incomes 40% above the national average.

Population
In mid-2003 Hart had an estimated 85,700 residents. This compares with the 2001 Census figure of 83,505 residents.  The 2001 Census also reported that there were 32,470 households, with 77% of residents describing their health as 'good'.  In the twenty years between 1982 and 2002 the population of Hart grew by 19 per cent, compared with an increase of 11 per cent for the South East region as a whole.

Politics

Elections to the council are held in three out of every four years, with one third of the 35 seats on the council being elected at each election. From the 2000 election to 2005 the Conservative party had a majority on the council. Until 2010 it was under no overall control. Between 2010 and 2012 the Conservatives again had control of the council, losing power again in the 2012 elections.

Following the 2019 election, the make-up of the Council is as follows:

Parishes and town councils
Blackwater and Hawley
Bramshill
Church Crookham
Crondall
Crookham Village
Dogmersfield
Elvetham Heath
Eversley
Ewshot
Fleet Town
Greywell
Hartley Wintney
Heckfield
Hook
Long Sutton
Mattingley
Odiham
Rotherwick
South Warnborough
Winchfield
Yateley

Etymology and council logo
Hart is the older word for a deer; the district had much more woodland than its current panoply of small woodlands and larger instance, Elvetham Heath/Forest (and later many well-stocked medieval deer parks) which reflected the local abundance of this type of prime game (manorial lords' favoured animal for hunting). The logo is a green outline of an antlered deer's head, in side profile.

References

External links
Hart District Council
Statistics on Hart District Council from the UK Government

 
Non-metropolitan districts of Hampshire